Yamir Moreno (1970; Havana) is a Professor of Physics at the Department of Theoretical Physics of the University of Zaragoza and Director of the Institute for Biocomputation and Physics of Complex Systems at the same institution.

Early life
Prof. Yamir Moreno was born in 1970 in Havana, Cuba. After graduating with the highest marks in Physics at the University of Havana in 1993, he completed a Master in Physics in 1996 at the same institution. He obtained a (Summa Cum Laude) Ph.D. in theoretical physics in 2000 from the University of Zaragoza and the same year joined the International Centre for Theoretical Physics in Trieste, Italy.

Career
Prof. Moreno returned to the University of Zaragoza in 2003 to join the Department of Theoretical Physics at the Faculty of Sciences and the Institute for Biocomputation and Physics of Complex Systems, where he created and has led the Complex Systems and Networks Lab since then. In 2011, he became the Scientific Secretary of the Institute, followed by his appointment as Deputy Director from 2015-2019. Nowadays, Prof. Moreno is the Director of the Institute. Prof. Moreno has served on several professional Societies. He became Vice-president of the Complex Systems Society in 2013 and in its elected President from 2015 to 2018. He was Vice-president Secretary of the Network Science Society from 2015 to 2018, when he was elected as President for the term 2018-2021. Prof. Moreno was a member of the Future and Emerging Technology Advisory Group of the Framework Programmes for Research and Technological Development from 2014 to 2018 and serves on the Advisory Board of the CS4HS' WHO Collaborating Centre at the University of British Columbia, Canada. Prof. Moreno is currently a Deputy Director (Complex Systems and Networks) at the ISI Foundation, where he was a Fellow from 2013 to 2016. He is also an External Faculty member of the Complexity Science Hub in Vienna, Austria.

At present, Prof. Moreno is a Divisional Associate Editor of Physical Review Letters (since 2014), Editor of the New Journal of Physics, of the Journal of Complex Networks, and of Chaos, Solitons & Fractals. He is also a member of the Editorial Boards of Scientific Reports, Applied Network Science, and Frontiers in Physics, and Academic Editor of PLoS ONE. He was named a Fellow of the American Physical Society in 2021.

Research
Prof. Moreno is known for his many contributions to topics related to the Structure and Dynamics of Complex Networked Systems, including pioneering works on disease transmission in networked populations, the study of nonlinear dynamical systems coupled to complex structures, on transport processes and diffusion with applications in communication and technological networks, on the dynamics of information and rumor propagation, as well as to evolutionary game theory, the emergence of collective behaviors in biological and social environments, the dynamics of Tuberculosis transmission and the structure and dynamics of Multilayer networks. As of Feb 2018, his scientific production amounts to 200+ peer-reviewed publications with a total of 17300+ citations and h-index=53 (ISI WoK, as of May 2019); and 28650+ and 64 (Google Scholar, as of May 2019). Relevant contributions include journals like Physics Reports, Nature Physics, Nature Communications, Proc. Natl. Acad. Sci. USA, Phys. Rev. Lett., Phys. Rev. X, Science Advances, etc. Citation record can be found here and here. He is a co-author of the most cited Physics Reports of the last 15 years (Complex Networks and their applications, Phys. Rep. 424, 175-304 (2006), 5400+ citations). Prof. Moreno has supervised 12 undergraduate and 11 PhD Thesis at the University of Zaragoza.

Relevant Works

The full list of publications can be found here.

E. Cozzo, G. Ferraz de Arruda, F. A. Rodrigues, and Y. Moreno, “Multiplex Networks: Basic Formalism and Structural Properties”, Monograph Springer Briefs in Complexity,  (2018).

References

External links

1970 births
Living people
Cuban physicists
University of Zaragoza alumni
Academic staff of the University of Zaragoza
Academic staff of the University of British Columbia
Network scientists
Fellows of the American Physical Society